Magnolia dealbata is a species of flowering plant in the family Magnoliaceae, native to Mexico. It is known commonly as the cloudforest magnolia and eloxochitl. It is sometimes considered to be a subspecies of Magnolia macrophylla, which is otherwise native to the southeastern United States.

Description
Magnolia dealbata is a deciduous tree, growing to average heights of 25 meters tall. Larger individuals can reach 40 to 50 meters in height. The flowers are large and white up to 20 cm long. Leaves are broad, reaching 50 cm in length.

Distribution and habitat
This species is endemic to cloud forests in the Sierra Madre de Oaxaca of northern Oaxaca in eastern Mexico, where it ranges from 600 and 1,900 meters elevation. More than ten subpopulations have been observed, and the species' estimated extent of occurrence is 2,750 to 3,000 km2. The largest population includes over a thousand trees.

It grows in humid montane cloud forests, alongside Magnolia oaxacensis, Pinus chiapensis, Quercus laurina, Liquidambar styraciflua, and Clethra sp.

Populations identified as M. dealbata in the Sierra Madre Oriental of Querétaro, Veracruz, Hidalgo, Nuevo Leon, Tamaulipas and San Luis Potosí correspond to more recently-described species including Magnolia nuevoleonensis, Magnolia rzedowskiana, and Magnolia vovidesii.

The species was once thought to be extinct until being rediscovered in 1977.

Etymology 
The name eloxochitl was given to the tree by the Aztecs. It is derived from the Nahuatl word elotl meaning "green ear of corn", and xochitl meaning "flower".

Uses 
Magnolia dealbata is cultivated as an ornamental plant, used as a flowering tree in gardens.

It is also used for timber, and as a traditional medicinal plant for heart conditions, asthma, and stomach pain. The flowers are used as decorations for spiritual and cultural events as well.

References

dealbata
Endemic flora of Mexico
Trees of Mexico
Flora of Hidalgo (state)
Flora of Oaxaca
Flora of Veracruz
Endangered biota of Mexico
Endangered plants
Garden plants of North America
Ornamental trees
Taxonomy articles created by Polbot
Taxa named by Joseph Gerhard Zuccarini
Flora of the Sierra Madre de Oaxaca
Cloud forest flora of Mexico
Plants described in 1837